Yunxiao railway station is a railway station located in Yunxiao County, Zhangzhou, Fujian Province, China, on the Xiamen–Shenzhen railway operated by the Nahchang Railway Bureau, China Railway Corporation.

References 

Railway stations in Fujian